Papyrus Oxyrhynchus 213 (P. Oxy. 213 or P. Oxy. II 213) consists of two fragments of a tragedy by an unknown author, written in Greek. It was discovered in Oxyrhynchus. The manuscript was written on papyrus in the form of a roll. It is dated to the second century. Currently it is housed in the British Library (Department of Manuscripts, 34) in London.

Description 
The document was written by an unknown copyist, although the roughness of the hand suggests that the scribe was a student. The measurements of "fragment a" are 80 by 113 mm and of "fragment b" 78 by 80 mm. The text is written in a large round upright uncial hand.  The verso side of the papyrus contains a list of names and amounts of money.

It was discovered by Grenfell and Hunt in 1897 in Oxyrhynchus. The text was published by Grenfell and Hunt in 1899.

See also 
 Oxyrhynchus Papyri
 Papyrus Oxyrhynchus 212
 Papyrus Oxyrhynchus 214

References 

213
2nd-century manuscripts
British Library collections